This is a list of Swedish queens consort and spouses of Swedish monarchs and regents. The list covers a large time span and the role of a consort has changed much over the centuries. The first Swedish consorts are spoken of in legends. Consorts until c. 1000 are often semi-legendary, as are monarchs. 

Due to unions with Denmark and Norway, many of the Swedish consorts were also consorts of monarchs of those countries. Consorts listed during the period of 1380–1520 were in fact also consorts to monarchs of Denmark. The consorts listed during the period of 1814-1905 were also consorts to monarchs of Norway. 

Finland was from the Middle Ages a part of Sweden, and although there was no official title, such as "Queen Consort of Finland", from the 16th century until the year of 1809; the queen consort of Sweden also held the title "Grand Princess of Finland." 

Sweden has had three female monarchs. One of the consorts listed below is male.

Semi-legendary queens 

This is a list of Swedish queens of legend. 
 
 Vana (wife of Sveigðir)
 Drifa (wife of Vanlandi)
 3rd century: Drott, wife of Domar
 4th century: Skjalf (wife of Agne)
 5th century: Bera (wife of Alf)
 6th century: Yrsa, wife of Eadgils
 7th century: Gauthildr Algautsdóttir of Götaland, (wife of Ingjald)
 7th century: Princess of Småland, daughter of king Heidrek of Småland, (wife of Ivar Vidfamne)
 8th century: Inghild of Sweden (wife of Randver)
 970-975: Ingeborg Thrandsdotter (wife of Olof Björnsson)

House of Uppsala and Stenkil

House of Sverker and of Eric

House of Bjälbo

House of Mecklenburg

Union queens and Regent Consorts 1397–1523 
Several of the Queens on this list were also Queen of Denmark and Norway, as well as spouses to Swedish regents who did not have the title king. 
Queen consorts

Regent consorts
 1448: Karin Karlsdotter, third wife of Regent Nils Jönsson
 1448: Merete Lydekedatter Stralendorp of Venngarn, second wife of Regent Bengt Jönsson.

Queen consorts

Regent consorts
1466-1467: Elin Gustavsdotter Sture (second time), Regent Erik Axelsson Tott

Queen consorts

Regent consorts
 1470-1497: Ingeborg Tott (first time), wife of Regent Sten Sture the Elder, d.1507.

Queen consorts

Regent consorts
1501-1503: Ingeborg Tott (second time), wife of Regent Sten Sture the Elder, d.1507.
 1504-1512: Mette Dyre, second wife of Svante, Regent of Sweden.
 1512-1520: Christina Gyllenstierna, wife of Regent Sten Sture the Younger d.1559.

Queen consorts

House of Vasa

House of Palatinate-Zweibrücken

House of Hesse

House of Holstein-Gottorp

House of Bernadotte

Regents 
Some Swedish consorts acted as regents for their husbands or children, and had seats in the governments. These were:

 1318-1326: Duchess Ingeborg, as widow of Prince Eric she was regent during the initial minority of her son.
 1424-1430: Philippa of England, her husbands' representative in the country during the union.
 1470-1497: Ingeborg Tott, (inconsistently during these years), during her husband's absence.
 1504-1512: Mette Dyre, (inconsistently during these years) seat in the government during husband's absences.
 1520-1520: Christina Gyllenstierna, regent and commander of Stockholm during the minority of her son.
 1605-1605: Christina of Holstein-Gottorp, during the absence of her husband.
 1611-1611: Christina of Holstein-Gottorp, as interim regent during the minority of her son.
 1660-1672: Hedwig Eleonora of Holstein-Gottorp, during the minority of her son.
 1697-1697: Hedwig Eleonora of Holstein-Gottorp, during the minority of her grandson.
 1700-1713: Hedwig Eleonora of Holstein-Gottorp, during the absence of her grandson.
 1731-1731: Ulrika Eleonora of Sweden, during the absence of her husband.
 1738-1738: Ulrika Eleonora of Sweden, during the absence of her husband.

Queens regnant 
This is a list of Swedish queens regnant:
 1389-1412: Margaret I of Denmark
 1632-1654: Christina of Sweden
 1718-1720: Ulrika Eleonora of Sweden (Queen consort 1720-1741)

Titular queens 
 1396-1405: Agnes of Brunswick-Lüneburg, spouse of King Albert of Sweden, deposed in 1389, renounced claims in 1405.
 1605-1631: Constance of Austria, spouse of King Sigismund III Vasa
 1637-1644: Cecilia Renata of Austria, spouse of King Władysław IV Vasa
 1646-1660: Ludwika Maria Gonzaga, spouse of King Władysław IV Vasa

See also 
 List of Swedish monarchs
 List of Finnish consorts (c. 13th-century-1809)
 List of Danish consorts (1397–1520)
 List of Norwegian consorts (1814–1905)

Notes 

Consorts
Swedish queens

Swedish
Sweden
consorts